The 1914–15 Scottish Districts season is a record of all the rugby union matches for Scotland's district teams.

History

There was no Inter-City match this year due to the First World War.

Schools matches continued this season; but the vast majority of District matches were cancelled due to the war.

One district match that was played - against the 4th battalion of the King's Own Scottish Borderers - was a charity match for the Belgian Relief Fund.

Results

Inter-City

None.

Other Scottish matches

KOSB:

South of Scotland District:

English matches

No other District matches played.

International matches

No touring matches this season.

References

1914–15 in Scottish rugby union
Scottish Districts seasons